A Contributor License Agreement (CLA) defines the terms under which intellectual property has been contributed to a company/project, typically software under an open source license.

Rationale 

CLAs can be used to enable vendors to easily pursue legal resolution in the case of copyright disputes, or to relicense products to which contributions have been received from third parties. CLAs are important especially for corporate open source projects under a copyleft license, since without a CLA the contribution would restrict the guardian as well.

The purpose of a CLA is to ensure that the guardian of a project's outputs has the necessary ownership or grants of rights over all contributions to allow them to distribute under the chosen license, often by granting an irrevocable license to allow the project maintainer to use the contribution; if copyright is actually transferred, the agreement is more normally known as a Copyright Transfer Agreement.  CLAs also have roles in raising awareness of IPR issues within a project.

Relicensing controversy 
When a CLA requires a contributor to assign unrestricted republishing rights to the project, contributed code can be relicensed at the discretion of the project, even when the CLA does not assign copyright to the project. Prominent open source advocates regard CLAs as dangerous to open source rights.

Examples 
In 2019 MongoDB used these rights granted by its CLA to achieve a move to a non-open-source license.

In January 2021, the Elasticsearch project used such rights to move the project to a non-open-source license.
Drew DeVault, a lead developer with a number of open source projects such as sway, regards this move as a loophole. Both these projects were licensed under a copyleft license, which uses copyright to protect contributions, yet the CLA negates the usefulness of copyright in achieving this protection: 
Elasticsearch belongs to its 1,573 contributors, who retain their copyright, and granted Elastic a license to distribute their work without restriction. This is the loophole which Elastic exploited when they decided that Elasticsearch would no longer be open source [...]

CLAs which restrict relicensing

Project Harmony 
Project Harmony was established by Canonical in 2010 to optionally avoid the problems discussed above. It provides a CLA template-builder. Based on choices made, the CLA will allow the contributor to keep copyright and assign rights to the project (as above) but with various restrictions on relicensing: using the template requires choosing one of the mutually-exclusive options, which range in restrictiveness. A real-world example is the Ubuntu project. The CLA leaves copyright with the contributor and allows the project to relicense the code but with a restriction based on the license the contribution was made under:
2.3 Outbound License

Based on the grant of rights in Sections 2.1 and 2.2, if We include Your Contribution in a Material, We may license the Contribution under any license, including copyleft, permissive, commercial, or proprietary licenses. As a condition on the exercise of this right, We agree to also license the Contribution under the terms of the license or licenses which We are using for the Material on the Submission Date.

Fedora 
The Fedora Project formerly required contributors to sign a CLA, either as an organization or as an individual. However, this was retired in 2011 and instead contributors must agree to the Fedora Project Contributor Agreement, which is not a license agreement and does not include assignment of copyright.

Users 

Companies and projects that use CLAs include:

 .NET Foundation
 Apache Software Foundation
 Canonical Ltd
 Clojure
 Cloud Native Computing Foundation
 CyanogenMod
 Diaspora
 Digia/Qt Project
 Discourse
 Django
 Dojo Toolkit
  eBay Software Foundation, LLC Subsidiary of eBay
 Eclipse
 Elastic
 Facebook
 Go
 Google
 HashiCorp
 InfluxDB
 Joomla
 jQuery
 Kubernetes
OpenBMC
 Python
 Meteor
 Microsoft
MuseScore
 OpenMediaVault
 OpenStack
 Puppet
 Salesforce
 TiddlyWiki
 TLDR Pages
 Zend Technologies for Zend Framework (1.x series only)

KDE 
KDE uses Free Software Foundation Europe's Fiduciary Licence Agreement of which (FLA-1.2) states in section 3.3:

However, it is optional and every contributor is allowed not to assign their copyright to KDE e.V.

See also
Developer Certificate of Origin
Project Harmony (FOSS group)

References

External links 
 Contributor Licence Agreements from OSS Watch
 ContributorAgreements.org
 CLA assistant — enables contributors to sign CLAs from within a pull request

Canonical (company)
Computer law
Copyright law
Intellectual property law
Licensing